The Sands of Dee is a 1912 silent short film directed by D. W. Griffith and starring Mae Marsh and Robert Harron. It was produced and distributed by the Biograph Company.

Paper print held at Library of Congress.

The film is used in the opening scene of the 1946 psychological horror film The Spiral Staircase in a recreation of early film exhibition. The Spiral Staircase is set in 1906, making the appearance of this 1912 film anachronistic.

Cast
Mae Marsh - Mary
Robert Harron - Bobby
Charles Hill Mailes - Mary's father
Grace Henderson - Mary's mother
Kate Toncray - Bobby's mother
Edwin August - The artist
Claire McDowell - The artist's fiancée

supporting cast
Spottiswoode Aitken
Wilfred Lucas
W. Chrystie Miller - A fisherman
Frank Opperman - A fisherman
Vivian Prescott

References

External links
 The Sands of Dee at IMDb.com

1912 films
American silent short films
Films directed by D. W. Griffith
Biograph Company films
American black-and-white films
1910s American films
Films based on works by Charles Kingsley